Hosea Chanchez (born September 12, 1981), also credited as Hosea, is an American actor best known for his recurring role on For Your Love and the quarterback football player Malik Wright on The CW/BET sitcom, The Game and its 2021 revival.

Early life and career
Born in Montgomery, Alabama, Chanchez spent most of his childhood in Alabama and Atlanta, Georgia. He attended Sidney Lanier High School in Montgomery, Alabama. After Chanchez relocated to California, he expressed in an interview with Wendy Williams that he had slept in his car for thirty days before starring in various guest roles on For Your Love, The Guardian, Jack & Bobby, NCIS, and Everwood.

From 2006 to 2015, he appeared on the CW television series The Game. Chanchez portrayed quarterback Malik El Debarge Wright, opposite Wendy Raquel Robinson (who portrayed his mother and agent). The series returned to the air on Black Entertainment Television on January 11, 2011, where the show has become a success. Chanchez also has a theater background with roles in Shop Life, The Wiz, The Long Walk Home, Royal Oats and Glory.

In September 2012, Chanchez starred in the BET original film Let The Church Say Amen which is adapted from ReShonda Tate Billingsley's 2005 best-selling novel of the same name. This was the directorial debut of actress Regina King.

Filmography

References

External links
 

1981 births
Living people
Sidney Lanier High School alumni
Hispanic and Latino American male actors
American male stage actors
American male television actors
American people of Dominican Republic descent
Male actors from Atlanta
Male actors from Montgomery, Alabama